The Rural Municipality of St. Peter No. 369 is a rural municipality (RM) in the Canadian province of Saskatchewan within Census Division No. 15 and  Division No. 5.

History 
The RM of St. Peter No. 369 incorporated as a rural municipality on December 11, 1911.

Geography

Communities and localities 
The following urban municipalities are surrounded by the RM.

Villages
 Annaheim
 Englefeld
 Lake Lenore
 St. Gregor
 Muenster

Demographics 

Government 
The RM of St. Peter No. 369 is governed by an elected municipal council and an appointed administrator that meets on the second Thursday of every month. The reeve of the RM is Glenn Ehalt while its administrator is Angie Peake. The RM's office is located in Annaheim.

Transportation 
 Canadian National Railway
 Saskatchewan Highway 5
 Saskatchewan Highway 368
 Saskatchewan Highway 756
 Saskatchewan Highway 777

See also 
List of rural municipalities in Saskatchewan

References 

St. Peter
Division No. 15, Saskatchewan